The Portuguese Singles Chart ranks the best-performing singles in Portugal, as compiled by the Associação Fonográfica Portuguesa.

See also
List of number-one albums of 2019 (Portugal)

References

Portugal
Number one singles
Singles 2019